Hypotia vulgaris is a species of snout moth in the genus Hypotia. It was described by Arthur Gardiner Butler in 1881 and is known from India, Pakistan, Iran, Qatar and Saudi Arabia.

References

Moths described in 1881
Hypotiini